The West Shore Conference was a high school athletic conference located in northeast Ohio, with member schools stretched across Cuyahoga, Erie, and Lorain counties.

Members when the league folded

See also
 Ohio High School Athletic Conferences

Notes
It was reported in November 2012 that Avon sought membership in the Southwestern Conference for the 2013–2014 school year to accommodate the merger of Berea and Midpark.  In December 2012, the Southwestern Conference approved Avon's addition for the 2015–2016 school year.
In March 2013, Lakewood and Midview were also approved for admission into the Southwestern Conference for the 2015–2016 school year.
In October 2013, North Ridgeville replaced Brecksville-Broadview Heights in the 2015–2016 school year.
On December 10, 2014, Vermilion announced plans to join the Sandusky Bay Conference beginning with the 2016–2017 school year as part of the SBC's expansion plans.

References

Ohio high school sports conferences